PJ & Duncan, who were later rebranded as Ant & Dec, began their musical career in 1993 with the release of the single "Tonight I'm Free". This was followed in 1994 by their successful debut album Psyche, which included the single "Let's Get Ready to Rhumble". Their second album Top Katz (1995) was less commercially successful than Psyche although all its singles reached the UK Top 20. PJ & Duncan were rebranded as Ant & Dec after they first started moving into TV (The Ant & Dec Show) in 1996, resulting in 1997's The Cult of Ant & Dec, their final album, which reached 15 in the UK charts. Their label, Telstar Records, decided not to renew their recording contract in 1997, and their career in music ended there. They reunited for live performances in 2000 and 2013 and for a single, "We're on the Ball", in 2002.

Albums

Studio albums

Compilation albums
1999 The Very Best of PJ & Duncan
1999 Ant & Dec - Greatest Hits
2000 Ant & Dec - The Hits
2008 The Essential Collection
2014 PJ & Duncan vs. Ant & Dec - The Collection

Extended plays
1994 Eternal Love E.P. 
1995 Stuck On U E.P. 
1995 Stepping Stone E.P.

Video albums
1994 Psyche - The Video
1995 Top Katz 
1996 Out On the Tiles - Live 
1997 The Cult of Ant & Dec

Singles

Other
1995 Now That's What I Call Music! 31
1996 Now That's What I Call Music! 35
1997 Now That's What I Call Music! 36
2000 CD:UK You Know Where it's At!
2001 CD:UK More Wicked Hits
2002 The Official Album of the 2002 FIFA World Cup
2006 England: The Album 2006
2006 Alien Autopsy
2007 Fun & Games
2013 Now That's What I Call 30 Years
2013 Now That's What I Call Music! 85

All are various artists albums. Ant & Dec appear on Now 36, 2002 FIFA World Cup and England The Album 2006 - with "We're on the Ball" being officially from 2002 FIFA World Cup. The remaining albums are albums released in conjunction with CD:UK, which at the time Ant & Dec presented (Ant & Dec also appear on the front cover of both albums).

An album of the Brit Awards 2001 was also released. Ant & Dec hosted the event.
2007 Fun & Games - featured "Let's Get Ready to Rhumble"
A soundtrack was released for the Ant & Dec film Alien Autopsy

Ant & Dec performed "Lets Get Ready To Rhumble" on ITV's television show Saturday Night Takeaway on 23 March 2013 as part of The Big Reunion. A few days later, on 31 March, "Lets Get Ready To Rhumble" became their first ever official number 1 single.

From their single 'Better Watch Out' until 'Lets Get Ready To Rhumble' PJ & Duncan used their real names:Ant and Dec.

References

External links
 Ant and Dec Official Website
 Video discography
 Official Charts - UK chart details - PJ and Duncan
 Official Charts - UK Chart details - Ant and Dec

Discographies of British artists
Ant & Dec
Pop music group discographies